Senecio deltoideus, also known as Canary creeper or climbing ragwort, is a climbing herb native to Southern Africa and Eastern Africa. Its name "deltoideus" refers to the leaves being shaped like a triangle.

Description

A slender climber, the plant forms clumps on the ground and in the underbrush of a scrubland, and is several feet long. Its leaves are dull green, serrated and broadly ovate, which become silvery and paler on the undersides. False, leaflike stipules occur at the bottom of the petioles. The capitula is bright yellow, that is produced in multitude of branched flowers.

Habitat
Native to Kenya, Tanzania, Malawi, Mozambique, Zimbabwe, Eswatini and South Africa, the plant is generally found in rocky areas within montane grassland, ecotones between forest and grassland, ericoid scrub, riparian zones and along waysides in areas receiving high precipitation.

See also
Delairea odorata, related climber

References

deltoideus
Creepers of South Africa
Vines
Flora of Kenya
Flora of Tanzania
Flora of Malawi
Flora of Mozambique
Flora of Zimbabwe
Flora of South Africa